Yokomo YZ-834B "Dog Fighter" is a 1/10 scale electric-powered 4WD radio-controlled vehicle made by Yokomo. Introduced in 1983 for off-road racing, it has been cited by the website, LiveRC, as the first racing specific 4WD buggy The car was marketed in Europe, sold by Graupner, as the Graupner Dogfighter and in the US by Delta Systems, as the Delta Dogfighter.

The RPS/Yokomo Dog Fighter SE was introduced following the 1985 IFMAR 1:10 Electric Off-Road World Championships win by Gil Losi Jr. The car was marketed by Ranch Pit Stop (hence RPS), a hobby retailer owned by Losi Jr's father; who later became known as Team Losi three years after.

Ron Rossetti used this version of the car to win the 1986 ROAR 1:10 Off-Road National Championships.

Despite its success in racing, including winning the aforementioned IFMAR Worlds, it was criticized for its low ground clearance, which meant it was unsuited to the UK racing.

The YZ-834B was replaced by YZ-870C in 1987.

References

Works cited

External links
Official Site of Yokomo Japan
about YZ-834B axles

Yz-834b
1:10 radio-controlled off-road buggies